Glemham is a surname. Notable people with the surname include:

Edward Glemham (died c. 1594), English voyager and privateer
Sir Charles Glemham (born 1576), English courtier and politician
Sir Henry Glemham (died 1632), English politician
Henry Glemham (c. 1603–1670), English royalist churchman
Sir Thomas Glemham (c. 1594–1649), English Royalist commander

See also
Great Glemham, a village in Suffolk, England
Little Glemham, a village in Suffolk, England
Glemham Hall, an Elizabethan stately home near Little Glemham
Glenham (disambiguation)